Prunus incisa, the Fuji cherry, is a species of flowering plant in the family Rosaceae, which gets its scientific name from the deep incisions on the leaves. It is an endemic species in Japan and grows wild in Kantō, Chūbu and Kinki regions. It is also called Fuji cherry because it grows especially heavily around Mount Fuji and Hakone. A dainty slow-growing, early white-flowering cherry, this century-old cultigen from Hondo, Japan is highly regarded as an ornamental but the wood has no industrial value. It is hardy to -20 °C, and crossed with Prunus speciosa, has yielded the cultivar Prunus 'Umineko'. It is in the ornamental section Pseudocerasus of the cherry subgenus Cerasus of the genus Prunus. Ma et al. classified it in a group with Prunus nipponica.

The following cultivars have gained the Royal Horticultural Society's Award of Garden Merit: 
'The Bride' 
'Kojo-no-mai' 
'Oshidori' 
Prunus incisa f. yamadei

In a large pot it will produce a dome of twiggy growth, and has the added bonus of brilliant autumn colour.

See also
 List of Award of Garden Merit flowering cherries

References

External links
 

Cherries
Flora of Japan
Garden plants
Prunus
Plants described in 1784
Ornamental trees